Deepambalpuram is a village in the Papanasam taluk of Thanjavur district, Tamil Nadu, India.

Demographics 

As per the 2001 census, Deepambalpuram had a total population of 670 with 322 males and 348 females. The sex ratio was 1081. The literacy rate was 64.58.

References 

 

Villages in Thanjavur district